TNJ or tnj may also refer to:

 Transport of New Jersey
 IATA code for Raja Haji Fisabilillah International Airport